Fábio Alves da Silva (born 4 January 1979), commonly known as Bilica, is a Brazilian professional footballer who plays as a defender for Brazilian club São Francisco Futebol Clube (AC).

Club career
Bilica is infamous for his statement during his time at Venezia when during a game against Brescia he claimed that he would break the legs of Roberto Baggio. Baggio wound up getting injured and stayed on the sidelines for several months, but the tackle was made by Antonio Marasco.

Bilica made his debut at Bahia. He then later played for clubs including Palermo, Köln and many more.

In 2004, Bilica was approached by Goiás Esporte Clube, as part of the manager Celso Roth's preparations for the 2004 Campeonato Brasileiro Série A. However, the negotiations with the Goiânia club did not go as expected. Bilica was then signed by the Porto Alegre club Grêmio. At Grêmio, Fábio Bilica was part of the squad that was relegated to the Série B. In a disastrous campaign, Grêmio was virtually relegated with four rounds to go to the end of the season, and Bilica was dismissed by the team after problems with the club, such as a verbal altercation with heckling fans, arguments with the coach Cláudio Duarte, and for the poor campaign and financial conditions of the club. Bilica was released by the club after the end of the season, amidst problems with the club president, Paulo Odone, and allegations of indiscipline and improper conduct.

In November 2007, he arrived in Romania, at Universitatea Cluj, there he played in 17 matches and in the last game of the season  which was the Cluj derby against CFR Cluj, Bilica fouled an opponent in his own penalty area, so CFR Cluj scored their winning goal. After this match, it was suspected that he did not play fair against CFR Cluj, helping them to win the Romanian championship instead of Steaua Bucharest. He later stated in an interview that he was contacted by some players from CFR Cluj with three days before the match who tried to convince him to "take it easy" against them, telling him they have a lot of money for him, but he refused.

Bilica signed for Sivasspor in July 2008 and caught the attention of Fenerbahçe. He later signed with Fenerbahçe on 8 June 2009 in exchange for Yasin Çakmak and €1.5 million.

International career
Bilica was a member of the Brazil Olympic team at the 2000 Summer Olympics in Sydney where he reached the quarter finals, Brazil lost to Cameroon at the quarter finals. He played in the Olympic team alongside much more famous players as Ronaldinho, Lúcio and Fábio Aurélio.

Trivia
While playing for Venezia during the 1999–2000 Serie A season, Bilica replaced the goalkeeper who had been sent off and then proceeded to save a penalty from A.C. Milan striker Andriy Shevchenko.

Honours
Fenerbahçe
 Süper Lig: 2010–11
 Turkish Cup: 2011–12
 Turkish Super Cup: 2009

References

External links
 
 
 Fábio Bilica at playmakerstats.com (English version of ogol.com.br)

1979 births
Living people
Brazilian footballers
Olympic footballers of Brazil
Footballers at the 2000 Summer Olympics
Brazil under-20 international footballers
Brazilian expatriate footballers
Esporte Clube Bahia players
FC Istres players
Venezia F.C. players
A.C. Ancona players
Goiás Esporte Clube players
Grêmio Foot-Ball Porto Alegrense players
Brescia Calcio players
Palermo F.C. players
1. FC Köln players
Sivasspor footballers
FC Universitatea Cluj players
Fenerbahçe S.K. footballers
Elazığspor footballers
Esporte Clube Vitória players
Auto Esporte Clube players
Atlético Cajazeirense de Desportos players
Batatais Futebol Clube players
Liga I players
2. Bundesliga players
Serie A players
Serie B players
Ligue 2 players
Süper Lig players
TFF First League players
Association football defenders
Expatriate footballers in Romania
Expatriate footballers in France
Expatriate footballers in Italy
Expatriate footballers in Germany
Expatriate footballers in Turkey
Brazilian expatriate sportspeople in Romania
Brazilian expatriate sportspeople in France
Brazilian expatriate sportspeople in Italy
Brazilian expatriate sportspeople in Germany
Brazilian expatriate sportspeople in Turkey